The 1987 Washington State Cougars football team was an American football team that represented Washington State University in the Pacific-10 Conference (Pac-10) during the 1987 NCAA Division I-A football season. In their first season under head coach Dennis Erickson, the Cougars compiled a 3–7–1 record (1–5–1 in Pac-10, ninth), and were outscored 356 to 238.

The team's statistical leaders included Timm Rosenbach with 2,446 passing yards, Richard Calvin with 822 rushing yards, and Steve Broussard with 701 receiving yards.

After nine years as WSU head coach, Jim Walden departed for Iowa State in the Big Eight Conference in late 1986, and was succeeded by Erickson, who returned to the Palouse in January 1987 after just one season at Wyoming; he had led neighboring Idaho for the previous four years.

Schedule

Roster

NFL Draft
Two Cougars were selected in the 1988 NFL Draft.

References

Washington State
Washington State Cougars football seasons
Washington State Cougars football